is the final in a series of compilation albums of various Disney songs which have been remixed in the style of eurobeat. It was produced by Walt Disney Records. The album Eurobeat Disney 3 was released on June 27, 2001.

Track listing
 Lolita & Domino - You Can Fly! You Can Fly! You Can Fly! (Peter Pan) - 4.27
 Fun Four - "Hakuna Matata" (The Lion King) - 4.13
 King & Queen - "Winnie The Pooh (2001 Version)" (The Many Adventures of Winnie the Pooh) - 4.26
 Dave Rodgers - "Livin' La Vida Mickey" (from the album La Vida Mickey) - 4.30
 J. Storm - "Ave Maria Op.52 No.6" (Fantasia) - 4.53
 ABeat Power - "Main Street Electrical Parade -Disneyland-" (Disneyland's Main Street Electrical Parade) - 4.36
 Nick Key - Bella Notte (Lady and the Tramp) 4.33
 Domino -  D.D.D! (cover of The Alfee song of the same name) - 4.30
 ABeat Sisters - "The Tiki, Tiki, Tiki Room" (Disneyland's The Enchanted Tiki Room) - 4.12
 Mega NRG Man - Perfect World (The Emperor's New Groove) - 4.18 
 Mickey B. - Zero To Hero (Hercules) - 5.09
 Susan Bell - "Love" (Robin Hood) - 4.05
 Derreck Simons - "Disney Mambo #5 (A Little Bit of...)" (from the album La Vida Mickey) - 4.14
 Ace Warrior - "I Wan'na Be Like You" (The Jungle Book) - 4.19
 Lolita - When She Loved Me (Toy Story 2) - 4.17
 Dave Rodgers - True To Your Heart (Mulan) - 4.21
 Mickey B. - "My Funny Friend And Me" (The Emperor's New Groove) - 5.23

External links
Eurobeat Disney 3 on Discogs

3
2001 compilation albums